Tessa Wullaert (born 19 March 1993) is a Belgian professional footballer who plays as a forward for Dutch club Fortuna Sittard and the Belgium national team.

Club career

Belgium
Wullaert's first team was SV Zulte Waregem in the Belgian First Division, where she played from 2008 to 2012. For the 2012–13 season, when a new joint league between Belgium and the Netherlands called BeNe League was created, she moved to RSC Anderlecht, with which she won the Belgian Cup. She left after one year at the club and signed for Standard Liège, scoring 16 league goals during the 2013–14 season and winning the Belgian Cup again. On her second season (2014–15) playing for Standard, she won the BeNe League top scorer award with 18 goals helping the club win the title.

Wolfsburg
In May 2015, Wullaert moved to VfL Wolfsburg. She spent three seasons with the club, winning two Bundesliga and three DFB-Pokal titles. She also appeared in two Champions League finals, both as a substitute.

Manchester City
In June 2018, Wullaert signed for English FA WSL club Manchester City. In her first season with the club, Wullaert won the FA Cup and League Cup double, finishing runner-up in the league. Following two seasons with the club, Wullaert announced she had declined a new contract and would be leaving.

Anderlecht
In 2020 Wullaert moved back to Belgium to be closer to her family and boyfriend. She signed a contract with Anderlecht that made her the only fully professional female footballer in Belgium at the time.

Fortuna Sittard
After 2 years in her native Belgium Wullaert agreed terms with newcomers to the Dutch Eredivisie Fortuna Sittard just across the border from Belgium.

International career

Wullaert represented Belgium at the 2011 UEFA Women's U-19 Championship and in the same year made her debut for the senior national team. After only a few years, she achieved the record for highest number of international goals by a Belgian female football player, she caught up with team captain Aline Zeler in Oktober 2015 and overtook her in March 2016.

Career statistics

Scores and results list Belgium's goal tally first, score column indicates score after each Wullaert goal.

Honours
Anderlecht
Belgian Women's Super League: 2021, 2022
Belgian Women's Cup: 2013, 2022

Standard Liège
BeNe League: 2014–15
Belgian Women's Cup: 2014

VfL Wolfsburg
DFB-Pokal: 2015–16, 2016–17, 2017–18
Bundesliga: 2016–17, 2017–18
UEFA Women's Champions League runner-up: 2015–16, 2017–18

Manchester City
FA Women's League Cup: 2018–19
FA Cup: 2018–19

Individual
 BeNe League top scorer: 2014–15
 Belgian Golden Shoe: 2016, 2018, 2019
 Belgian Professional Footballer of the Year: 2021–22

References

External links

 
 
 Player German domestic football stats  at DFB
 

1993 births
Living people
Women's association football forwards
Belgian women's footballers
Belgium women's international footballers
Belgian expatriate women's footballers
Belgian expatriate sportspeople in Germany
Belgian expatriate sportspeople in England
Expatriate women's footballers in Germany
VfL Wolfsburg (women) players
Standard Liège (women) players
Manchester City W.F.C. players
Women's Super League players
RSC Anderlecht (women) players
People from Tielt
Frauen-Bundesliga players
BeNe League players
FIFA Century Club
Footballers from West Flanders
UEFA Women's Euro 2022 players
UEFA Women's Euro 2017 players
Fortuna Sittard (women) players
Eredivisie (women) players